Chasing Dreams is a 1982 American sports drama film co-directed by Therese Conte and Sean Roche, starring David G. Brown. Its plot revolves around a teenage boy, growing up on a farm, who discovers he has a knack for baseball. The film is mainly remembered for a small role by Kevin Costner as the hero's older brother.

References

External links

1982 films
1982 drama films
1980s English-language films